The Battle of Malplaquet took place on 11 September 1709 during the War of the Spanish Succession and was fought between a French army commanded by the Duke of Villars and a Grand Alliance force under John Churchill, the Duke of Marlborough. In one of the bloodiest battles of the 18th century, the Allies won a narrow victory but suffered heavy casualties, while the French were able to withdraw in good order.  

At the start of 1709, the French state seemed on the verge of collapse, its treasury empty and food scarce while Allied advances in 1708 left the kingdom open to an invasion. These factors made the Allies overconfident and their excessive demands led to the collapse of peace talks in April. Villars had been instructed to avoid battle but after the capture of Tournai in early September, the Allies moved against Mons and Louis XIV of France ordered him to prevent its loss. Although the two armies made contact on 10 September, Marlborough delayed his attack until the next day, giving Villars the opportunity to strengthen his defensive positions. 

When the battle began on 11 September, Marlborough used his standard tactic of simultaneous infantry attacks on the flanks, forcing Villars to move troops from the centre, which would then be broken by a mass cavalry charge. While successful in other battles, at Malplaquet the French were better led, held stronger positions and were highly motivated; as a result, the flank attacks incurred heavy casualties, particularly on the left where the Dutch lost over 5,000 men in less than thirty minutes and nearly 8,500 in all. Although the overall plan worked, the French cavalry ensured their centre did not collapse as on previous occasions, while the Allied infantry was too weakened by their losses to conduct a pursuit, allowing the French to withdraw intact. 

The Allies lost over 20,000 men in the battle, the French no less than 8,000, casualties which shocked contemporaries and heightened internal divisions within the Grand Alliance over the wisdom of continuing the war. It has been argued Malplaquet was a French strategic victory, since by saving his army and preventing an invasion of France, Villars ultimately enabled Louis to negotiate far better peace terms in 1713 than those available in 1709. While there is some truth to this, it did little to change the immediate strategic situation; Mons surrendered shortly afterward and the Allies resumed their advance in 1710. Some historians suggest the biggest impact of the battle was in restoring French military confidence after years of defeat.

Background
The start of the campaign was delayed by the severe winter of 1708/1709 which made gathering supplies difficult, combined with peace talks in The Hague. Although Louis XIV was willing to accept most of the terms offered, the demand he provide troops to oust his own grandson, Philip V of Spain, was a humiliation he could not agree to and talks broke down at the end of April. For both sides, strategy was dictated by these negotiations; the French state was bankrupt, and in early 1709 the garrisons of Tournai, Arras, St Omer, Valenciennes and Cambrai mutinied over lack of food and pay. To prevent any further deterioration in his bargaining position, Louis ordered Villars to avoid battle at all costs; ordinarily an extremely aggressive general, he instead built a series of defensive lines running from Saint-Venant to Douai on the River Scarpe. 

Convinced France was on the verge of collapse, the Grand Alliance looked to keep up the pressure by advancing through the line of fortresses known as the "Pré carré". While French strategy was decided by Louis, the Allies' had to be approved by the British, Dutch and Austrian governments, and often required compromise. Since he considered the positions held by Villars too strong for a frontal assault, and the Dutch opposed his preferred option of Ypres, Marlborough agreed to make Tournai the main objective for 1709. 

Although persistent heavy rain caused further delays, the Siege of Tournai commenced on 15 June; one of the strongest fortresses in France and held by a garrison of 7,700, it surrendered on 3 September and Marlborough immediately marched on Mons. Having assumed Tournai would hold out until October and thus consume the entire 1709 campaign season, shortly before its fall Louis ordered Villars to prevent the loss of Mons "at all costs...the salvation of France is at stake". The main Allied army arrived east of the town on 7 September, awaiting the arrival of their siege artillery from Tournai; Villars took up positions to the southwest on 9th, leaving the two forces facing each other across the gap of Malplaquet.

Battle

Marlborough and his deputy Prince Eugene of Savoy knew Villars had been instructed to fight for Mons and tried to tempt him into the open, hoping to gain a decisive victory. Too experienced to make this mistake, Villars spent 10 September strengthening his defensive positions; largely undisturbed by the Allies, his troops constructed earthworks covering the open ground in the centre, with additional entrenchments extending into the woods on either side (see map). Marlborough delayed his attack until the arrival of reinforcements from Tournai under Henry Withers, a decision criticised then and later, one analyst arguing "the battle should have taken place on the 10th or not at all". 

The Allied battle plan was the same as that successfully employed at Blenheim, Ramillies and Oudenarde. On each occasion, frontal assaults on the French flanks forced them to move troops from the centre, which was then broken by mass cavalry attacks; although the leading units took heavy casualties, overall losses were substantially less than those suffered by the defeated. The differences at Malplaquet were more decisive French leadership, well prepared defensive positions and a far better performance by their men.  The restricted ground also prevented Marlborough quickly shifting troops from one wing to another as the battle developed, an approach he often used to keep his opponents off balance.                      

Villars had 80 guns and between 75,000 to 80,000 men, most of whom were French with significant numbers of Bavarian and Swiss mercenaries, as well as the Irish Brigade. He commanded the left, de la Colonie the centre, with the right led by 67 year old Marshal Boufflers, who was senior to Villars in rank but volunteered to serve under him. The infantry held a continuous line of entrenchments supported by artillery, with the cavalry massed in the rear. The Allied force on the battlefield was roughly 86,000 men and 100 guns; on the right, around 30,000 German and Danish infantry under Prince Eugene, with the Prince of Orange and 18,000 Dutch infantry on the left and their cavalry stationed immediately behind. Count Tilly, who had succeeded Lord Overkirk as the senior Dutch commander, led the entire left wing, at least in name; for he supported the anti-orangist party, while his officers were largely on the side of the Prince of Orange, and obeyed him more than they obeyed Tilly. The centre was held by 8,000 mostly British infantry, commanded by the experienced Earl of Orkney, with the bulk of the 30,000 cavalry positioned immediately behind.  

       
Battle commenced around 07:00 on 11 September, when the Allied right under Count Finckenstein, Lottum and Schulenburg moved against French positions in Sars Wood. Three hours of hand to hand combat ensued, both sides taking heavy losses, while Prince Eugene was wounded in the neck but refused to leave the field. At 07:30, led by François Nicolas Fagel, 13 Dutch battalions on the Allied far left, under which Swiss troops and the Scots Brigade, assaulted the French entrenchments. While making progress initially, they were pushed back with heavy losses. Seeing this, the Prince of Orange and Sicco van Goslinga, who had 17 battalions at their disposal, decided to come to the aid of Fagel's troops by attacking the French positions close to the Farm of Blairon. The Dutch suffered over 5,000 casualties in less than 30 minutes, including many senior officers. They persisted with incredible fortitude until Marlborough told the Prince of Orange to stop. Some British commentators claim the Dutch attack was supposed to be a "demonstration" rather than a full scale assault, but this appears unlikely and Marlborough took full responsibility for the failure. Orkney later wrote the Dutch dead lay "as thick as ever you saw a flock of sheep."

Despite their losses, Prince Eugene's attacks forced Villars to reinforce his left with troops taken from the centre to prevent its collapse. Although Withers and his detachment from Tournai were supposed to have supported the Dutch, they arrived too late and were instructed instead to make a flanking move north of the French lines in Sars Wood. It took over two hours to complete this manoeuvre, by which time the fighting had largely ended, but their presence was another factor for Villars to consider. By midday, he had taken over 77 battalions from the centre, allowing Orkney to finally over-run their positions; soon after, Villars' knee was smashed by a musket ball and he transferred command to Boufflers, with Puységur taking over the left.

Orkney's advance in the centre enabled the Allied horse to move past the captured earthworks and form up on the other side, where they were attacked by the elite Maison du Roi cavalry under Boufflers. Orkney was driven back, before the French in turn were repulsed by massed fire from the Allied infantry; with the French left finally crumbling under pressure from Withers and Schulenburg, the Prince of Orange, reinforced by troops from Marlborough, ordered a last mass assault on the French right. At last a few Dutch cavalry squadrons broke through the French positions. Followed by 30,000 Allied horsemen, under Prince of Hesse and the Prince d'Auvergne, they then attacked the French cavalry in what would prove to be the biggest cavalry engagement of the 18th century. Puységur began to withdraw, and at 15:00, Boufflers ordered a general retreat. An effective Allied pursuit was prevented by exhaustion and casualties totalling around 20,000 to 30,000 killed or wounded, 8,462 of which were suffered by the Dutch infantry.  General consensus is that French losses ranged between 8,000 to 12,000 killed or wounded, plus 500 prisoners, although some Dutch historians argue they may have been closer to 17,000 in total.

Aftermath

Although horrified by the casualties, contemporaries generally considered Malplaquet an Allied victory since they retained possession of the battlefield, while Mons surrendered on 21 October.  With Villars incapacitated by his wounds, Boufflers opened his report on the battle to Louis XIV by saying "...misfortune compels me to announce the loss of another battle, but I can assure your Majesty that misfortune has never been accompanied by greater glory". In a similar vein, Villars later wrote: "Si Dieu nous fait la grâce de perdre encore une pareille bataille, Votre Majesté peut compter que tous ses ennemis seront détruits". ["If God grants us the grace to lose such a battle again, Your Majesty can count on all of his enemies being destroyed".]  

Leaving aside the question of relative casualties, there are grounds for viewing Malplaquet as a French strategic victory. Despite losing Mons, keeping his army largely intact meant Louis was able to negotiate far better peace terms in 1713 than those available in 1709. It certainly highlighted Allied divisions over war aims and concerns over the cost,  but these issues predated Malplaquet; even before the 1709 campaign, Marlborough was among those who felt Whig demands of "No Peace Without Spain" were excessive. In that respect, Malplaquet had less impact on British government policy than Spanish successes at Alicante and La Gudina.

At the beginning of the war, the French army was viewed as the best in Europe, a reputation shattered by a series of defeats between 1704 and 1708. French historian André Corvisier suggests the importance of Malplaquet in French military history lies primarily in its psychological effect; despite being a narrow defeat which did little to change the immediate strategic situation, it is seen as more significant than their victory at Denain in 1712. He argues 18th century authors viewed it as marking the point at which the French army regained its confidence, while for those writing after the 1870 Franco-Prussian War, it provided proof of French resilience and ability to recover from catastrophic defeat.    

Prior to the resumption of peace talks in 1710, Marlborough wrote to the Allied negotiators that 'thanks to our victory..., you may have what peace you want'. His reasoning was that as well as losing the key fortress of Mons, after Malplaquet the French army could only act on the defensive and remained short of men and money, while crop failures and another harsh winter caused widespread famine. In spring 1710, the Allies resumed their advance almost unopposed; by September they had broken through the secondary line of the "Pré carré", capturing Douai, Béthune, Aire and Saint-Venant. Short of supplies and with many of his regiments reduced to less than half their official size, Villars could not risk the last significant French field army in another battle. 

The immediate impact of Malplaquet was political rather than military and when peace negotiations resumed in March 1710 at Geertruidenberg, it was clear the mood in Britain had changed. Marlborough's domestic opponents used the heavy casualties to attack him, arguing they could have been avoided, and Queen Anne failed to congratulate him as she had on his previous victories. Reluctance to continue fighting for what seemed marginal gains resulted in a landslide victory for the Tories in the October 1710 British general election, although they confirmed their commitment to the war to prevent a credit crisis.  Despite success in France, British opposition to continuing the war was strengthened by defeats at Brihuega and Villaviciosa in December 1710 which confirmed Philip V as king of Spain, the ostensible cause of the war in the first place. 

In contrast, many Dutch politicians blamed their losses on Marlborough's tactics, Withers for allegedly failing to support their attack, and the Prince of Orange for continuing the assault after it became clear the French positions were too strong. Although Grand Pensionary Anthonie Heinsius congratulated the Allied army on their victory, he and others felt the price paid in Dutch casualties required more than simply the capture of Mons, and insisted on more stringent peace terms. Sicco van Goslinga, the Dutch envoy attached to Marlborough's staff, considered such demands unrealistic, arguing such casualties were to be expected given they had taken Lille and Mons, "two of the strongest fortresses in Europe" and won "one of the hardest battles ever fought".

In April 1711, the Habsburg candidate for the Spanish throne, Archduke Charles, succeeded his brother Joseph as Holy Roman Emperor, making the continuation of the war pointless since the union of Spain with Austria was as unwelcome to Britain as one with France. While the capture of Bouchain in September 1711 left the road to Paris open, the British bypassed their allies and secretly negotiated peace terms directly with Louis XIV, signing the Preliminary Articles of London on 8 October 1711. At the end of 1711, Marlborough was replaced by the Tory Duke of Ormonde with orders to prevent any further offensive action by British troops.    

Swiss mercenaries fought on both sides in the battle, six battalions with the French, including two of Swiss Guards, and another eight with the Dutch. Two were commanded by members of the von May family from Bern, Gabriel for the Dutch and Hans Rudolf for the French. With more than 8,000 Swiss casualties, the battle caused heavy controversy in the Swiss Diet. Malplaquet was the last action where Swiss mercenaries directly engaged one another until Bailén in 1808. 

Written many years later, a firsthand account of the battle is given in the book Amiable Renegade: The Memoirs of Peter Drake (1671–1753). An Irishman who served in various European armies, Drake fought with the Maison du Roi at Malplaquet and was captured after being wounded several times. Another notable Irish émigré, Féilim Ó Néill, was among those killed serving with the Irish Brigade.

Notes

References

Sources

External links

Battles of the War of the Spanish Succession
Battles involving Great Britain
Battles involving the Netherlands
Battles involving France
Battles involving Austria
Battles involving Prussia
Battles involving the Dutch Republic
Conflicts in 1709
1709 in France
Battles involving Bavaria
Battles in Hauts-de-France